Dar-e Maku (also Romanized as Dar-e Makū) is a village in Rudkhaneh Rural District, Rudkhaneh District, Rudan County, Hormozgan Province, Iran. At the 2006 census, its population was 142, in 26 families.

References 

Populated places in Rudan County